Carabus kantaikensis is a species of ground beetle in Carabinae subfamily that are endemic to Russia.

References

kantaikensis
Beetles described in 1924
Endemic fauna of Russia